Táncdalfesztivál (literally Festival of dance music) was series of Hungarian pop music competitions and exhibition shows, airing on the National Television from 1966 to 1994.

Significance
In a country with only one television channel, Táncdalfesztivál was the premier chance for young musicians to showcase their skills and become well known in the Hungary of the '60s. It was the starting point in the career of the era's most popular performers, like Kati Kovács, Pál Szécsi, Klári Katona or Zsuzsa Koncz.

As television sets were just becoming widespread, it also meant a good opportunity to musicians already popular from the radio, but never seen performing live. Performers who gained fame through the show include Éva Mikes, Mária Toldy, Katalin Sárosi, János Koós, and László Aradszky. According to János Bródy, the Táncdalfesztivál series played a key role in the renewal of the contemporary Hungarian music scene, which spread beyond national borders.

The TV show had similar, equally successful radio counterparts called Tessék Választani and Made in Hungary.

Chronology

The classical Táncdalfesztivál was held annually between 1966 and 1972, followed by irregularly held competitions having varying name and scope until 1994.

1966 Táncdalfesztivál '66
1967 Táncdalfesztivál '67
1968 Táncdalfesztivál '68
1969 Táncdalfesztivál '69
1971 Táncdalfesztivál '71
1972 Táncdalfesztivál '72
1977 Metronóm '77
1981 Tánc- és popdalfesztivál
1986 Interpop Fesztivál
1988 Interpop Fesztivál
1992 Volt egyszer egy fesztivál
1992 Egri Táncdalfesztivál
1993 Pop-rock fesztivál (Mitax Organ)
1993 II. Egri Táncdalfesztivál
1994 A Magyar Televízió Táncdalfesztiválja

Sources
István Zoltán Kiss. Magyar könnyűzenei lexikon 1962-től. Budapest: ZAJ-ZONe, 1998. 
Dénes Gáncs, János Zoltán. A dallam diadala – A táncdalfesztiválok története. Budapest: La Ventana, 2004.

External links
tancdalfesztival.lap.hu - a site collecting links related to Táncdalfesztivál and its performers

Hungarian television shows
Talent shows
1960s Hungarian television series
1970s Hungarian television series
1980s Hungarian television series
1990s Hungarian television series